Alexander Vasin (born 1952) is a Russian mathematician, Professor, Dr.Sc., a professor at the Faculty of Computer Science at the Moscow State University. Specialist in the field of the theory of non-cooperative games and its applications to economics and biology.

He defended the thesis "Evolutionary models and principles of optimality of collective behavior" for the degree of Doctor of Physical and Mathematical Sciences (1991). Was awarded the title of Professor (1994).

Author of 6 books and more than 50 scientific articles.

References

Literature

External links
 MSU CMC
 Scientific works of Alexander Vasin
 Scientific works of Alexander Vasin

Russian computer scientists
Russian mathematicians
Living people
Academic staff of Moscow State University
1952 births
Moscow State University alumni